Grethe Thordahl (11 December 1926 – 29 June 2004) was a Danish stage and film actress. She competed in the Dansk Melodi Grand Prix on 15 February 1964 at the Tivoli Concert Hall, performing the song "Polka i Grand Prix", which she sang with Fredrik but did not place in the top three.

Filmography 
Far betaler (1946)
Mani (1947)
Kampen mod uretten (1949)
Smedestræde 4 (1950)
Det sande ansigt (1951)
Fodboldpræsten (1951)
Husmandstøsen (1952)
To minutter for sent (1952)
Tine (1964)
Bejleren - en jysk røverhistorie (1975)

References

External links

Danish stage actresses
Danish film actresses
1926 births
2004 deaths
People from Aarhus Municipality
Place of death missing